Neopotamia divisa is a moth of the family Tortricidae. It is found in India, Thailand and Vietnam.

References

Moths described in 1900
Olethreutini
Moths of Japan